Arpeggio is a musical term.

Arpeggio may also refer to:

 "Arpeggio" (Björk song), a bonus track by Björk on the album Utopia
 Arpeggio (Sly Cooper), a character in the video game series Sly Cooper
 Arpeggio, a 1997 composition by Howard Skempton
 Arpeggio, a 1980s disco band produced by Simon Soussan
 Arpeggio, a 2011 album by Ed Alleyne-Johnson
 "Arpeggio", a theme song for the video game Judgment
 Étude Op. 10, No. 11 (Chopin), also known as Arpeggio